Millennium High School is an English Medium School in Kalwakurthy, Telangana, India. This co-educational school located at Kalwakurthi-Devarakonda road with all basic facilities under the State Syllabus was founded in 2011. The school provides education from LKG standard to 10th standard. It was founded by a group of educationalists from the state of Kerala headed by Shinto P John. It was established in 2011 June with 320 students in Kalwakurthy

References

High schools and secondary schools in Telangana
Educational institutions established in 2011
2011 establishments in Andhra Pradesh